The New Hope Rural Historic Archeological District encompasses a collection of historic archaeological sites in Chatham County, North Carolina.  The area, now partially inundated by Jordan Lake, was identified as archaeologically sensitive by the United States Army Corps of Engineers during the planning for the lake.  The sites include the remains of farmsteads, and at least one slave cemetery.

The district was listed on the National Register of Historic Places in 1985.

See also
National Register of Historic Places listings in Chatham County, North Carolina

References

Archaeological sites on the National Register of Historic Places in North Carolina
Chatham County, North Carolina
Historic districts on the National Register of Historic Places in North Carolina
National Register of Historic Places in Chatham County, North Carolina
1985 establishments in North Carolina